Alvin M. Coleman (born December 27, 1944) is a former American football defensive back who played college football for Jackson State and Tennessee State and professional football in the National Football League (NFL) for the Minnesota Vikings (1967), the Cincinnati Bengals (1969-1971), and Philadelphia Eagles (1972-1973). He appeared in 57 NFL games, 19 of them as a starter.

Early years
Coleman was born in 1944 in Gulfport, Mississippi, and attended Jim Hill High School in Jackson, Mississippi. He played college football for the Jackson State and Tennessee State.

Professional football
He was drafted by the Minnesota Vikings in the fourth round (87th overall pick) of the 1967 NFL Draft. He appeared in only two games for the Vikings and spent the next two seasons in the minor leagues with the Des Moines Warriors and Charleston Rockets. In 1969, he signed with the Cincinnati Bengals and appeared in 29 games for the club, including 19 starts, from 1969 to 1971.  He concluded his career playing for the Philadelphia Eagles, appearing in 26 games during the 1972 and 1973 seasons.

References

1944 births
Living people
American football defensive backs
Minnesota Vikings players
Cincinnati Bengals players
Philadelphia Eagles players
Jackson State Tigers football players
Tennessee State Tigers football players
Sportspeople from Gulfport, Mississippi
Players of American football from Mississippi